Patricia Walker-Shaw (July 26, 1939 – June 30, 1985) served as President of the Universal Life Insurance Company of Memphis, Tennessee.

Biography

Patricia Walker-Shaw was born Lily Patricia Walker as the eldest of three children born to A. Maceo and Harriette (Ish) Walker.

She is the granddaughter of Joseph Edison Walker, who founded the Universal Life Insurance Company in Memphis, Tennessee in 1923.  In 1983, she became president of the company upon the retirement of her father A. Maceo Walker. She would serve as president until her death in 1985.

She married Harold Shaw. This union produced a child, Harold Shaw, Jr., who worked for the Universal Life Insurance Company and Tri-State Bank until his death in 2019, this made him the fourth generation of the family to do so.

She received a Candace Award from the National Coalition of 100 Black Women in 1983.

References

Phelps, Shirelle (editor), "Who's Who Among African Americans", Gale, Detroit and London, 1998 (11th Edition)

1939 births
1985 deaths
American businesspeople in insurance
African-American business executives
American business executives
20th-century American businesspeople
20th-century American businesswomen
20th-century African-American women
20th-century African-American people